1984 in philosophy

Events

Publications 
 Nel Noddings, Caring: A Feminine Approach to Ethics and Moral Education
 Fredric Jameson, Postmodernism, or, the Cultural Logic of Late Capitalism 
 Derek Parfit, Reasons and Persons

Philosophical fiction 
 Milan Kundera, The Unbearable Lightness of Being

Births

Deaths 
 March 30 - Karl Rahner (born 1904)
 June 25 - Michel Foucault (born 1926)
 November 26 - Bernard Lonergan (born 1904)

References 

Philosophy
20th-century philosophy
Philosophy by year